Rafael Moreira Araújo (born 23 May 1990) has been known professionally as Rafael Moreira, or to fans, simply Rafa. He is a Brazilian footballer who plays for C.D. Trofense as a midfielder.

References

 

1990 births
Living people
Brazilian footballers
Brazilian people of Portuguese descent
Association football midfielders
C.D. Trofense players
C.F. Fão players
Footballers from São Paulo